KVBC-LP (channel 13) is a low-power television station in Reedley, California, United States, affiliated with Ion Television. The station is owned by Ventura Broadcasting.

History
The station signed on as HTV affiliate KCWB-LP in the early-2000s. In 2005, KCWB flipped to Almavision until mid-summer, when they became an affiliate of the new Tvida Vision network.

On March 20, 2014, KVBC-LD launched with 10 digital subchannels.

Technical information

Subchannels
The station's digital signal is multiplexed:

References

VBC-LP
Television channels and stations established in 2005
MeTV affiliates
Movies! affiliates
Retro TV affiliates
True Crime Network affiliates
Buzzr affiliates
Low-power television stations in the United States
Start TV affiliates
NewsNet affiliates